Copromorpha phytochroa is a moth in the Copromorphidae family. It is found on Java.

References

Natural History Museum Lepidoptera generic names catalog

Copromorphidae
Moths described in 1953